Plinthograptis sipalia is a species of moth of the family Tortricidae. It is found in Nigeria.

The length of the forewings is about 6 mm. The ground colour of the forewings is grey, with the costa and terminal pattern yellow-orange, spotted with brown. There is a red pattern. The hindwings are brownish.

References

Endemic fauna of Nigeria
Moths described in 1981
Tortricini
Moths of Africa
Taxa named by Józef Razowski